The Estadio Rubén Deras is a football stadium located in Choloma, Honduras. It is home of Atlético Choloma and it has a capacity of 5 500 spectators.

References

External links
 World Stadiums page

Ruben Deras, Estadio
Honduras